The banhu (板胡, pinyin: bǎnhú) is a Chinese traditional bowed string instrument in the huqin family of instruments.  It is used primarily in northern China. Ban means a piece of wood and hu is short for huqin.

Like the more familiar erhu and gaohu, the banhu has two strings, is held vertically, and the bow hair passes in between the two strings.  The banhu differs in construction from the erhu in that its soundbox is generally made from a coconut shell rather than wood, and instead of a snakeskin that is commonly used to cover the faces of huqin instruments, the banhu uses a thin wooden board.

The banhu is sometimes also called "banghu," because it is often used in bangzi
opera of northern China, such as Qinqiang from Shaanxi province.

The yehu, another type of Chinese fiddle with a coconut body and wooden face, is used primarily in southern China.

External links

Listening

Banhu MP3s (click on headphones to listen to individual tracks)

See also 

 Huqin
 Yehu
 Music of China
 Traditional Chinese musical instruments
 Rebab
 String instruments

References 

Chinese musical instruments
Huqin family instruments
Necked bowl lutes